The 2013 German Masters (officially the 2013 Betfair German Masters) was a professional ranking snooker tournament that took place between 30 January – 3 February 2013 at the Tempodrom in Berlin, Germany. It was the sixth ranking event of the 2012/2013 season.

Ronnie O'Sullivan was the defending champion, but he decided not to compete this year.

Ali Carter won his third ranking title by defeating Marco Fu 9–6 in the final.

Prize fund
The breakdown of prize money for this year is shown below: 

Winner: €60,000
Runner-up: €32,000
Semi-final: €16,000
Quarter-final: €9,000
Last 16: €4,500
Last 32: €2,750
Last 64: €1,500

Non-televised highest break: €0
Televised highest break: €2,000
Total: €300,000

Main draw

Final

Qualifying
Qualifying matches were held between 28 and 30 November 2012 at the World Snooker Academy in Sheffield, England. 10 matches from the second qualifying round, were held over and played on 30 January 2013 at the Tempodrom in Berlin, Germany. Matches were over 9 frames.

Round 1

Round 2

Century breaks

 144, 122  Michael Holt
 142, 127, 115  Kurt Maflin
 142, 126, 110, 108, 104, 100  Marco Fu
 141, 130  Liang Wenbo
 141, 106  Judd Trump
 141  Neil Robertson
 140  Robert Milkins
 135  Matthew Selt
 134, 114  Ding Junhui
 133, 127, 116, 107  Shaun Murphy
 132, 130, 122, 106, 102  Barry Hawkins
 131  Graeme Dott
 130  Xiao Guodong
 129  Thepchaiya Un-Nooh
 128, 102  Joe Perry
 128  Adam Duffy
 123, 114, 104  Mark Selby

 121, 116  Ali Carter
 121, 102  Dave Harold
 120  Mark Joyce
 119  Ricky Walden
 116  Fergal O'Brien
 112  James Wattana
 107  Jamie Jones
 105  Stuart Bingham
 105  Mark King
 103  Pankaj Advani
 102  Rod Lawler
 101  Thanawat Thirapongpaiboon
 101  Matthew Stevens
 100  Gerard Greene
 100  Luca Brecel
 100  Fraser Patrick
 100  Mark Allen

References

2013
German Masters
Masters
Sports competitions in Berlin